Magas of Cyrene (born before 317 BC – 250 BC, ruled 276 BC – 250 BC) was a Greek King of Cyrenaica. Through his mother’s second marriage to Ptolemy I he became a member of the Ptolemaic dynasty. He managed to wrest independence for Cyrenaica (in modern Libya) from the Greek Ptolemaic dynasty of Ancient Egypt, and became King of Cyrenaica from 276 BC to 250 BC.

Family background and early life
Magas was the first-born son of the noblewoman Berenice I and her first husband Philip, who had served as a military officer in the campaigns of Alexander the Great. He had two younger sisters: Antigone of Epirus and Theoxena of Syracuse. His father, Philip was the son of Amyntas by an unnamed mother. Plutarch (Pyrrhus 4.4) implies that his father was previously married and had children, including daughters born to him. Phillip served as a military officer in the service of the Macedonian king Alexander the Great and was known for commanding one division of the phalanx in Alexander’s wars.

His mother Berenice was a noblewoman from Eordeaea. She was the daughter of local obscure nobleman Magas and noblewoman Antigone. Berenice’s mother was the niece of the powerful regent Antipater and was a distant collateral relative to the Argead dynasty. He was the namesake of his maternal grandfather.

About 318 BCE, his father died of natural causes. After the death of Magas’ father, Magas’ mother took him and his siblings to the Ptolemaic Kingdom, where they were a part of the entourage of his mother’s second maternal cousin Eurydice. Eurydice was then the wife of Ptolemy I Soter, the first Greek pharaoh and founder of the Ptolemaic dynasty. 

By 317 BCE, Ptolemy I fell in love with Berenice and repudiated Eurydice to marry her. His mother, through her marriage to Ptolemy, thus became an Egyptian Queen and the Queen mother of the Ptolemaic dynasty. Through his mother's marriage to Ptolemy, Magas was a stepson to Ptolemy; he became an Egyptian Prince living in his stepfather's court and was a member of the Ptolemaic dynasty. His mother bore Ptolemy three children: two daughters, Arsinoe II, Philotera and the future Pharaoh Ptolemy II Philadelphus.

Governorship and kingship of Cyrenaica

Around five years after the death of the Cyrenese ruler Ophellas, Magas, then about 20 years old, received the governorship of Cyrenaica from the ruling Ptolemies in Egypt: his mother Queen Berenice I and his stepfather Ptolemy I.

As a posthumous honor to his biological father, Magas, when he served as a priest of the Greek God Apollo, had dedicated an honorific inscription proudly naming him as ‘the eponymous priest’ and ‘Magas son of Philip’. 

Following the death of his stepfather Ptolemy I in 283 BC, Magas tried on several occasions to wrest independence for Cyrenaica from his stepfather's successor, his maternal half-brother Ptolemy Philadelphus, until he crowned himself King around 276 BC. It was the first time Cyrene had a king since Arcesilaus IV around 440 BC.

Magas then married Apama II, his third maternal cousin and one of the daughters of Seleucid King Antiochus I Soter and Stratonice of Syria. Antiochus I used his marital alliance to foment a pact to invade Egypt. Apama II and Magas had a daughter called Berenice II, who was their only child. 

Magas opened hostilities against Ptolemy II in 274 BC, attacking Egypt from the west, as Antiochus I was attacking Palestine. However, Magas had to cancel his operations due to an internal revolt of the Libyan nomad Marmaridae. In the east, Antiochus I suffered defeat against the armies of Ptolemy II. Magas at least managed to maintain the independence of Cyrenaica until his death in 250 BC.  Magas betrothed his daughter Berenice II to Ptolemy III Euergetes, the son of Ptolemy II, as a way to seal an alliance between the two realms and secure the independence of Cyrene. 

After the death of Magas, Apama II broke the marital alliance between her daughter Berenice II and Ptolemy III and proposed her daughter and the throne to Demetrius the Fair, son of the Antigonid king Demetrius I Poliorcetes, who became the new king of Cyrene. This gave the Antigonids strategic control of the western side of the Ptolemaic Kingdom. After Demetrius was assassinated by Berenice for cheating 
with her mother Apama, Berenice returned to Egypt to finally marry her original fiancé, Ptolemy III Euergetes.

Magas is known to have favored the arts and sciences in Cyrene, and was close to the philosophical school of the Cyrenaics. The philosophy of the Cyrenaics under Magas evolved in a way that has similarities with Skepticism, Epicurianism and also Buddhism.

Relations with India

Magas was known by name to the contemporary Indian Emperor Ashoka, and he may have received Buddhist emissaries from India: indeed Magas is mentioned in the Edicts of Ashoka, as one of the recipients of Ashoka's Buddhist proselytism. Ashoka also claims that he encouraged the development of herbalism, for men and animals, in the territories of the Hellenistic Kings.

There are no records of such emissaries in Western sources. However, the philosopher Hegesias of Cyrene, from the city of Cyrene where Magas ruled in Cyrenaica, is sometimes thought to have been influenced by the teachings of Ashoka's Buddhist missionaries, given the similarity of some of his teachings with Buddhism.

Still, Magas probably was quite knowledgeable about India. His father, Philip, had been a phalanx officer in the campaigns of Alexander the Great. Later, Magas, having been raised in part at the Ptolemaic court, must also have received first-hand accounts of India from his stepfather Ptolemy I, a former general in Alexander's campaigns.  The predecessor of Magas in Cyrene, the Ptolemaic governor named Ophellas, had also been one of the Alexander's officers in India, in charge of one of his triremes during the expedition down the Indus River. Magas was probably quite acquainted with matters pertaining to India through his contacts with such veterans of the Indian campaigns.

See also
List of kings of Cyrene

References

Sources
 W. Heckel, Who’s who in the age of Alexander the Great: prosopography of Alexander’s empire, Wiley-Blackwell, 2006

External links
 Coinage of Magas of Cyrene
 Coinage Magas issued when Governor of Cyrenaica, coinage Ael 7.1, 7.2 & 7

|-

4th-century BC births
4th-century BC Macedonians
3rd-century BC Macedonians
250 BC deaths
Buddhism in the ancient Mediterranean
Kings of Cyrene
Ptolemaic governors
Year of birth unknown